Carcasses is a Canadian docufiction film, directed by Denis Côté and released in 2009. Blending documentary and fictionalized elements, the film is a portrait of Jean-Paul Colmor, a real-life man who runs a scrapyard of old broken-down cars, with a cast consisting almost entirely of non-professional actors.

The film premiered at the 2009 Cannes Film Festival, in the Director's Fortnight stream. It was well-received on the whole, although its premiere was marred by one patron who so intensely disliked the film that he loudly booed while the rest of the audience applauded at the conclusion of the screening, and interrupted the post-screening press conference to express his criticisms.

The film was named to the Toronto International Film Festival's year-end Canada's Top Ten list for 2009.

References

External links
 

2009 films
2009 drama films
Canadian docufiction films
Films directed by Denis Côté
French-language Canadian films
2000s Canadian films